Bénac is the name of the following French communes:

 Bénac, Ariège, in the Ariège department
 Bénac, Hautes-Pyrénées, in the Hautes-Pyrénées department